The 1948 GP Ouest-France was the 12th edition of the GP Ouest-France cycle race and was held on 31 August 1948. The race started and finished in Plouay. The race was won by Eloi Tassin.

General classification

References

1948
1948 in road cycling
1948 in French sport